Lentigo  is a genus of sea snails, marine gastropod mollusks in the family Strombidae, the true conchs.

Species
Species within the genus Lentigo include:
Lentigo lentiginosus (Linnaeus, 1758)
Lentigo pipus (Röding, 1798)

References

Strombidae